A-maze-ing Laughter is a 2009 bronze sculpture by Yue Minjun, located in Morton Park in Vancouver, British Columbia, Canada.

Description
A-maze-ing Laughter was designed by Yue Minjun and installed in Morton Park (Davie and Denman) along the English Bay in West End, Vancouver in 2009. The patinated bronze sculpture, composed of 14 statues each about three meters tall and weighing over 250 kilograms, portrays the artist's own image "in a state of hysterical laughter". It was created as part of the Vancouver International Sculpture Biennale, which exhibits international contemporary works in public spaces. The sculpture was donated to the City of Vancouver by Chip and Shannon Wilson through the Wilson5 Foundation on August 11, 2012.

As part of the installation, an inscription carved into cement seating states "May this sculpture inspire laughter playfulness and joy in all who experience it."

Reception
A-maze-ing Laughter was nominated in the Great Places in Canada Contest 2013 and was the only work of public art to receive a nomination.

See also

 2009 in art

References

External links

2009 establishments in British Columbia
2009 sculptures
Bronze sculptures in British Columbia
Outdoor sculptures in Vancouver
Sculptures of men in Canada
Statues in Canada
Works by Chinese people
West End, Vancouver